Sonja Bilgeri (born 13 July 1964) is a German former cross-country skier. She competed in four events at the 1988 Winter Olympics.

Cross-country skiing results

Olympic Games

World Cup

Season standings

References

External links
 

1964 births
Living people
German female cross-country skiers
Olympic cross-country skiers of West Germany
Cross-country skiers at the 1988 Winter Olympics
People from Oberallgäu
Sportspeople from Swabia (Bavaria)